Kouotou Kounjouenko Casimir Bruno (born December 17, 1981) is a Cameroonian-born Indonesian former footballer who plays as a centre-back.

Club career

Sriwijaya
He was signed for Sriwijaya to play in Liga 2 in the 2019 season. Casimir made 8 league appearances and without scoring a goal for Sriwijaya.

PSMS Medan
In middle season 2019, Bruno Casimir signed a year contract with PSMS Medan from Sriwijaya. He made 10 league appearances and scored 1 goal for PSMS.

Persis Solo
He was signed for Persis Solo to play in Liga 2 in the 2020 season. This season was suspended on 27 March 2020 due to the COVID-19 pandemic. The season was abandoned and was declared void on 20 January 2021.

PS Siak
In 2021, Casimir signed a contract with Indonesian Liga 3 club PS Siak. On 21 December 2021 PS Siak successfully won the 2021 Liga 3 Riau Final, after defeating Tornado on penalties (4-3) after previously playing 1-1. He made 18 league appearances and scored 2 goals for PS Siak.

Career statistics

Honours

Club
Persiba Bantul
 Indonesian Premier Division: 2010-11
PS Siak
 Liga 3 Riau: 2021

References

External links 
 
 Bruno Casimir at ligaindonesiabaru.com

1981 births
Living people
Footballers from Douala
Cameroonian footballers
Cameroonian expatriate footballers
Expatriate footballers in Indonesia
Cameroonian expatriate sportspeople in Indonesia
Liga 1 (Indonesia) players
Indonesian Premier League players
Indonesian Premier Division players
Arema F.C. players
Persita Tangerang players
Persidafon Dafonsoro players
Persiba Bantul players
PSS Sleman players
Association football defenders
Naturalised citizens of Indonesia
Indonesian people of Cameroonian descent